Charles Nwokolo, also known by his nickname Young Dick Tiger (born 21 September 1960) is a Nigerian former professional boxer. As an amateur, he competed in the men's light welterweight event at the 1984 Summer Olympics.

References

External links
 
 

1960 births
Living people
Nigerian male boxers
Olympic boxers of Nigeria
Boxers at the 1984 Summer Olympics
Boxers at the 1982 Commonwealth Games
Commonwealth Games bronze medallists for Nigeria
Commonwealth Games medallists in boxing
Sportspeople from Lagos
Light-welterweight boxers
African Boxing Union champions
Welterweight boxers
Medallists at the 1982 Commonwealth Games